John Jannarone is an Italian-American businessman who is founder of Capital Markets Media LLC, the sole owner of IPO Edge and CorpGov. He was previously senior writer at CNBC, which he joined in 2014. Previously, he was a corporate media and entertainment writer at The Wall Street Journal.  In 2008, Jannarone joined The WSJ's financial analysis section "Heard on the Street" as a Singapore-based reporter. Prior to that Jannarone worked as a deputy bureau chief at Dow Jones, as an analyst at The Hartnett Group in Dallas and at Morgan Stanley in New York City.

Jannarone is most well known for breaking the story about The WSJ's corporate parent News Corp. splitting into two divisions: Entertainment and Publishing.

Jannarone is well known for his work which "expos[ed] accounting irregularities at Diamond Foods. The irregularities caused a 70% fall in the company's stock price and a collapse of the planned $2.4 billion takeover of Pringles and resignation of the CEO.

Personal
Born in 1980, Jannarone currently resides in Manhattan, New York. He obtained his degree in economics from Princeton University where he graduated cum laude.

References 

1980 births
Living people
The Wall Street Journal people
Princeton University alumni